Vélizy-Villacoublay is a commune in the Yvelines department in the Île-de-France in north-central France. Its inhabitants are called Véliziens.

Geography
Established on the Parisian plateau, the town of Vélizy-Villacoublay borders Meudon in the north-east, Clamart in the east, Bièvres in the south-east, Viroflay in the north-west, and Chaville in the north.

There are six districts: Mozart, le Clos, le Mail, Louvois, la Pointe Ouest et Vélizy-le-Bas (with l'Ursine and le Bocage).

History
The word "Vélizy" comes from the Latin word villa.  "Villacoublay" is formed from the same word, combined with the Gallo-Roman patronym "Escoblenus". Originally called simply Vélizy, the name of the commune became officially Vélizy-Villacoublay in 1938.

The territory was formed  from three distinct manors: Vélizy, Villacoublay, and Ursine, established in the 11th century. The domains were progressively annexed into the royal estate beginning in the 12th century (Vélizy was annexed at the end of the 13th century).

The airbase in Villacoublay, Vélizy – Villacoublay Air Base, was built in 1911.  In 1974 the Vélizy 2 shopping mall was opened.

The body of Diana, Princess of Wales was flown to RAF Northolt, west London, from here after her death in Paris on August 31, 1997.

Population

Main sights
The Saint-Denis church
The Saint-Jean-Baptiste church, in modern style.
The barracks of the Compagnies Républicaines de Sécurité (CRS).
l'Onde Cultural Center, finished in December 2000 and designed by the architect Claude Vasconi, which is composed of one hall with 670 seats, a multidisciplinary room of 200 seats, two large dance halls, an orchestra room, 12 studios, 4 classrooms, a recording room, and a percussion room.

Transport
Vélizy-Villacoublay is served by no station of the Paris Métro, RER, or suburban rail network. The closest station to Vélizy-Villacoublay is Chaville–Vélizy station on Paris RER line C. This station is located in the neighboring commune of Viroflay,  from the town center of Vélizy-Villacoublay. Since 2014, Vélizy-Villacoublay has been served by tramway line T6 with 7 stations.

The town is also served by the A86 autoroute, the 118 national route (RN118), and the RN286. The A86 includes a two-leveled tunnel between Rueil-Malmaison and Vélizy-Villacoublay. It is also served by a Veolia Transport bus line (Connex), of the RATP,

Economy
Biggest Shopping Center of Île-de-France: Vélizy-2
Car dealerships: Porsche, Audi, BMW, Mini, Citroën
Numerous companies and offices:
Aeronautic: EADS, MBDA, Messier-Dowty, Messier-Bugatti
Agricultural: Kraft Foods
Automotive: manufacturing plants of PSA Peugeot Citroën,  Renault Trucks
Biotechnology: Novacyt
Building and Public Works Sector: Eiffage
Electronics: Thales, Ateme, Dassault Systèmes.
Research: Laboratoire d'ingénierie des systèmes de Versailles
Telecommunications: Alcatel-Lucent, Bouygues Télécom, Ekinops, Transcom, Sagem
Information technology: Sun Microsystems, Dassault Systèmes, Quintiles/IMS Health
Video Games: Blizzard (Vivendi-Universal Games)
French Air Force Base 107 Vélizy – Villacoublay Air Base (HQ of French Special Forces)
Group 61 of the CRS

Education 
 ISTY
 University Institute of Technology of Vélizy
 Versailles Saint-Quentin-en-Yvelines University

Twin towns – sister cities

Vélizy-Villacoublay is twinned with:
 Alytus, Lithuania
 Dietzenbach, Germany
 Harlow, England, United Kingdom

See also
Communes of the Yvelines department

References

External links

Official website 

Communes of Yvelines
Yvelines communes articles needing translation from French Wikipedia